Marofarihy is a rural municipality in Madagascar. It belongs to the district of Manakara-Atsimo_(district), which is a part of Fitovinany. The population of the commune was estimated to be approximately 7,000 in 2001 commune census.

Geography
The municipality is situated at 15 km North of Manakara. It is crossed by the National Road 12 and the Fianarantsoa-Côte Est railway. 

5 Fokontany (villages) belong to this municipality: Marofarihy, Ambotaka, Mideboka, Alakamisy Anivosoa and Ambohimandroso.

Only primary schooling is available. Farming and raising livestock provides employment for 46.5% and 46.5% of the working population. The most important crop is rice, while other important products are coffee, sugarcane and lychee. Industry and services provide employment for 3% and 4% of the population, respectively.

Rivers
 The Managnano river.

References

Populated places in Fitovinany